Bokermannohyla vulcaniae is a species of frogs in the family Hylidae. It is endemic to Brazil and only known from the region of its type locality in Poços de Caldas, Minas Gerais state. The specific name vulcaniae refers to the volcanic origin of the area of the type locality.

Description
It has brown dorsum, becoming paler ventrally. The snout is rounded. The tympanum is distinct and the supratympanic fold is well-defined. The fingers and toes are webbed and bear terminal discs; the toes are more heavily webbed than the fingers but bear smaller discs.

The male advertisement call consists of two pulsed notes emitted together or separately. The first note has fewer pulses (average: 4.5 pulses) and a lower dominant frequency (840 Hz) than the second one (respectively 10 pulses and 1240 Hz).

Tadpoles of Gosner stages 26–27 measure  in total length, of which the body makes .

Habitat

Conservation status
The species was assessed as "vulnerable" by IUCN in 2008 because its known distribution area is restricted and because of habitat loss related to agricultural and mining activities in the area. After the assessment, two populations in conservation areas have been found (in the  Municipal Park and the Botanical Garden of Poços de Caldas).

References

vulcaniae
Frogs of South America
Amphibians of Brazil
Endemic fauna of Brazil
Amphibians described in 2005